Wael Riad (born February 8, 1982) is an Egyptian footballer. He plays in the attacking midfielder position for the Egyptian club El Gouna.

Club career

Loan to Grazer AK
Riad transferred to Grazer AK on loan in January 2007. He participated in two friendly matches in February, scoring a goal in each game. Cheetos played 5 matches with Grazer AK's first team between February and April 2007, starting once and scoring no goals.

International career

National Youth team
Wael Riad was a regular player in Egypt's Youth team who were Bronze Medalists at the 2001 FIFA World Youth Championship in Argentina. He scored against Finland in the group stage and again in the win against the United States in the last 16.

References

1981 births
Living people
Egyptian footballers
Egyptian expatriate footballers
Egypt international footballers
Al Ahly SC players
Grazer AK players
Association football midfielders